Godziesze Wielkie  is a village in Kalisz County, Greater Poland Voivodeship, in west-central Poland. It is the seat of the gmina (administrative district) called Gmina Godziesze Wielkie.

The village has a population of 720.

In 2002 near village was planted a forest in memory of victims terrorist attacks on the World Trade Center in 2001. Over 5,000 trees were planted in the clearing after the fire.

Notable residents

Karolina Pawliczak (born 1976), lawyer and politician

References

Villages in Kalisz County